Auguste Laurent (14 November 1807 – 15 April 1853) was a French chemist who helped in the founding of organic chemistry with his discoveries of anthracene, phthalic acid, and carbolic acid.

He devised a systematic nomenclature for organic chemistry based on structural grouping of atoms within molecules to determine how the molecules combine in organic reactions. He studied under Jean-Baptiste Dumas as a laboratory assistant and worked with Charles Frédéric Gerhardt. He died in Paris from tuberculosis.

Bibliography
Marc Tiffeneau (ed.) (1918). Correspondance de Charles Gerhardt, tome 1, Laurent et Gerhardt, Paris, Masson.

References

Fisher, Nicholas W. "Auguste Laurent." Encyclopædia Britannica Mobile. 2013. web.

External links
 http://scienceworld.wolfram.com/biography/Laurent.html
 Friedrich August Kekulé von Stradonitz
Josette Fournier, "Auguste Laurent (1807-1853) dans la Revue scientifique du Dr. Quesneville", Revue d'Histoire de la Pharmacie, 2008, no.  359  pp. 287-303

1807 births
1853 deaths
19th-century French chemists
French Ministers of Overseas France
People from Haute-Marne